Holy Trinity Roman Catholic Church Complex is a historic Polish, Roman Catholic and former church located at Niagara Falls in Niagara County, New York within the Diocese of Buffalo.

Description
The complex was constructed between 1906 and 1914 and consists of the church, school, rectory, convent, and garage.  The church is built of random course stone walls and has a steeply pitched, slate shingled gable roof.  It features a central facade tower with spire and Romanesque Revival detailing.

The complex was purchased by a not-for-profit group, Niagara Heritage of Hope and Service, in 2009. It was listed on the National Register of Historic Places in 2010.

Gallery

References

External links
Historic Holy Trinity website
National Trust for Historic Preservation: "Closed Niagara Falls Church Landmarked," By Stephanie Smith, March 24, 2008

Roman Catholic churches completed in 1914
20th-century Roman Catholic church buildings in the United States
Churches on the National Register of Historic Places in New York (state)
Romanesque Revival church buildings in New York (state)
Churches in Niagara County, New York
Roman Catholic churches in New York (state)
Polish-American culture in New York (state)
National Register of Historic Places in Niagara County, New York
1906 establishments in New York (state)